The Belgian LETAS Trophy is a women's professional golf tournament played as part of the LET Access Series, held in the Belgium.

Winners

See also
Belgian Ladies Open

References

External links

LET Access Series events
Golf tournaments in Belgium